In Caribbean fly-fishing, a Grand Slam is when an angler is able to catch a bonefish, tarpon and permit throughout the course of a day. The International Game Fish Association (IGFA) defines an Inshore Grand Slam as catching any three of the following species on the same day: the bonefish, tarpon, permit, and snook.

The seas surrounding Cuba are one of the most spectacular places to accomplish a Grand Slam. The Gran Grand Slam also exists, that consists in catching the four species previously mentioned.

Fly fishing